The Richmond Heights Memorial Library is a public library in Richmond Heights, Missouri, a suburb of St. Louis.  Established in 1933, the library holds more than 60,000 items. It offers several activities and services for all ages.

It is a member of the Municipal Library Consortium of St. Louis County, nine independent libraries in St. Louis County.

References

External links
 
 Libraries.org | https://librarytechnology.org/library/20311

Public libraries in Missouri
Libraries in Greater St. Louis
Municipal Library Consortium of St. Louis County